Suncheon Bay National Garden is located in Suncheon (Suncheon-si) in South Jeolla Province, South Korea. The area of the garden is 1.112 km² plus 28 km² of Suncheon Bay. About 860,000 trees and 650,000 autumn flowers such as roses, sunflowers, and cosmos flowers are planted in the garden. The city opened Suncheon Bay International Garden Expo 2013 from April 20 to October 20, attracting over 4.4 million visitors. One of the expo officials said that the main purpose of the expo was to preserve Suncheon Bay by building a garden.

Suncheon Bay Garden was designated as the No.1 National Garden in August and held a proclamation ceremony on September 5, 2015. According to the data collected from Suncheon on October 13, the total visitors of the garden is now at the 400 million mark.

The workshop on how to spread the garden culture and to activate the garden industry was held on November 5 at the Suncheon Bay International Wetland Center. This workshop was co-organized by Korea Forest Service and Korea Green Promotion Agency.

Arboretum
The Arboretum zone features various kinds of path including Autumn Tint path, Maple Tree path, and Meditation path. It also features Korean Traditional Garden where the Palace Garden, the Noblemen's Garden, and the Garden of Hope can be found. The Royal Azalea Garden has locally grown royal azalea trees with over a hundred species of royal azaleas. Another feature of arboretum is the Tree Ground which has over 200 species of naturally grown trees such as southern magnolia, zelkova, and hackberry tree.

Wetland Center 

The Wetland Center Zone features the Dream Bridge designed by artist Kang Ik-Jung. The wall of the bridge is decorated with 145,000 drawings on old shipping container by children around the world. It also operates SkyCube which runs between the Expo grounds and Suncheon Bay Ecological Park. The Suncheon Bay International Wetland Center which is one of the main buildings of the Expo is built in the Wetland Center Zone. This center is where visitors can experience activities and learn about importance of Suncheon Bay. It also features Water Bird's Playground, Wildlife Conversation Park, and ECOGEO Greenhouse.

World Garden Zone 

The World Garden Zone is a collaborative space created by designers and artists from Korea and all over the world. It consists of indoor, outdoor gardens, and gardens of 11 countries including German, Dutch, Japanese, and Spanish.

Wetland Zone 
The Wetland Zone is where visitors can experience natural environments. The Biotope Wetland was built to protect the Suncheon Bay wetland ecology. A walking trail work as a guide for visitors to explore ecology of inland wetland. The Kindness Forest is for visitors in all-age, where the smooth pavements make wheelchairs and strollers accessible. The Eco-Training Playground is where visitors can learn about wetlands by examining plants of the wetland and ecology with a help of ecology experts.

References

External links 
 Homepage of Suncheon Bay National Garden (Korean) 
 Korea Tourism Organization Information Page (English) 

Gardens in South Korea
Suncheon